Sungai Durian, or "Durian River", is a village in the district of Patamuan, Padang Pariaman Regency, in the province of West Sumatra, Indonesia.

Location
It is bounded to the north by the village of Tandikat, to the west by the villages of Koto Baru and Batu Kalang, to the south by the village of Sungai Sariak to the east by the villages of Sungai Asam and Sicincin.
There are two mosques.

Demographics

The village had 4,635 inhabitants as of the 2010 census.
Demographics were:

Notes

Sources

Padang Pariaman Regency
Populated places in West Sumatra